Events in the year 2010 in Namibia.

Incumbents 

 President: Hifikepunye Pohamba
 Prime Minister: Nahas Angula
 Chief Justice of Namibia: Peter Shivute

Events 

 26 & 27 November – The country held elections for their local and regional councils.

Deaths

References 

 
2010s in Namibia
Years of the 21st century in Namibia
Namibia
Namibia